The Campaign to Suppress Bandits in Shiwandashan was a counter-guerrilla / counterinsurgency campaign the communists fought against the Kuomintang guerrilla left behind after the nationalist regime withdrew from mainland China.  The campaign was fought during the Chinese Civil War in the post-World War II era in the region of Shiwandashan (十万大山, literally meaning Ten Thousand Great Mountains) in Guangxi at the China-Vietnam border and resulted in communist victory.  This campaign is part of Campaign to Suppress Bandits in Guangxi, which in turn, was part of Campaign to Suppress Bandits in Central and Southern China.

Order of battle
Nationalist:
Anticommunist National Salvation Army at the Border Region of Guangdong and Guangxi
Communist:
A regiment of the Longzhou Military Sub-District
129th Division
134th Division

Battles
After the nationalist retreat, the nationalist troops left behind joined the local bandits in the region of Shiwandashan (十万大山) under order to continue the fight against their common communist enemy in the form of guerrilla / insurgency warfare.  In early December 1950, communist force consisted of a regiment of the communist Longzhou Military Sub-District, the communist 129th Division and the communist 134th Division were tasked to eradicate the nationalists in the region.  The original communist plan of attacking on December 20, 1950, was forced to be carried out early on December 13, 1950, when the intelligence revealed that the nationalists planned to withdraw to Vietnam.  After three days of travel, the communists succeeded in besieging the nationalist within the Chinese border.  The nationalists attempt a futile breakout by sending out a small force to sneak out of the encirclement and cross the border, but the entire 80 member strong force was annihilated by the communist regiment of the Longzhou Military Sub-District in the region to the north of Jiute (九特).  The remaining nationalists attempted to flee eastward, but they were annihilated by the enemy at the Taiping (太平) Mountain region.  The battles afterward became eradication operations on small scales.  By February 1951, the communist victory was complete.

Conclusion
By February 1951, the campaign concluded with communist victory, with nationalist commanders either killed or captured, including Wei Xiuying (韦秀英), the commander-in-chief of the nationalist Anticommunist National Salvation Army at the Border Region of Guangdong and Guangxi, and Wei Yuzhuang (韦雨庄), the director of the nationalist Anticommunist National Salvation Committee.  The 31,000 strong nationalist guerrilla in Shiwandashan (十万大山) was completely annihilated.  In addition, the communists also captured 58 pieces of artillery, 33 machine guns, 39,844 firearms, and 3 radio sets.

See also
List of battles of the Chinese Civil War
National Revolutionary Army
History of the People's Liberation Army
Chinese Civil War

References

Zhu, Zongzhen and Wang, Chaoguang, Liberation War History, 1st Edition, Social Scientific Literary Publishing House in Beijing, 2000,  (set)
Zhang, Ping, History of the Liberation War, 1st Edition, Chinese Youth Publishing House in Beijing, 1987,  (pbk.)
Jie, Lifu, Records of the Liberation War: The Decisive Battle of Two Kinds of Fates, 1st Edition, Hebei People's Publishing House in Shijiazhuang, 1990,  (set)
Literary and Historical Research Committee of the Anhui Committee of the Chinese People's Political Consultative Conference, Liberation War, 1st Edition, Anhui People's Publishing House in Hefei, 1987, 
Li, Zuomin, Heroic Division and Iron Horse: Records of the Liberation War, 1st Edition, Chinese Communist Party History Publishing House in Beijing, 2004, 
Wang, Xingsheng, and Zhang, Jingshan, Chinese Liberation War, 1st Edition, People's Liberation Army Literature and Art Publishing House in Beijing, 2001,  (set)
Huang, Youlan, History of the Chinese People's Liberation War, 1st Edition, Archives Publishing House in Beijing, 1992, 
Liu Wusheng, From Yan'an to Beijing: A Collection of Military Records and Research Publications of Important Campaigns in the Liberation War, 1st Edition, Central Literary Publishing House in Beijing, 1993, 
Tang, Yilu and Bi, Jianzhong, History of Chinese People's Liberation Army in Chinese Liberation War, 1st Edition, Military Scientific Publishing House in Beijing, 1993 – 1997,  (Volum 1), 7800219615 (Volum 2), 7800219631 (Volum 3), 7801370937 (Volum 4), and 7801370953 (Volum 5)

Conflicts in 1950
Conflicts in 1951
Shiwandashan
1950 in China
1951 in China
Military history of Fujian
Campaigns to Suppress Bandits